The 11th Division, an infantry division of the United States Army, was activated twice during the First World War. During the Second World War the division was notionally reactivated as part of Fortitude South II.

History

World War I
The 11th Division was first formed as a National Guard division in early 1917 consisting of units of the Michigan and Wisconsin National Guards. By the end of that same year, the 11th Division became the 32nd Division (later 32nd Infantry Division).

The 11th Division was reformed as a National Army division in August 1918, and was commanded briefly by Joseph Alfred Gaston before Jesse McI. Carter took over. The division was nicknamed the Lafayette Division, and its shoulder sleeve insignia included a silhouette of Lafayette. The 17th Infantry Regiment, and the 63rd Infantry Regiment were the two units chosen as the cadre around which the division would be formed. The 71st and 72nd Infantry Regiments were formed from cadres from the 17th and 63rd Regiments. The division's field artillery brigade was trained at West Point, Kentucky, and never actually joined the division at Camp Meade. The division's advanced schools detachment started for England on 25 October 1918, arriving 8 November 1918. With the Armistice, further activities were halted and the division disbanded on 29 November 1918 at Camp Meade, Maryland.

World War II (deception formation)

The 11th Infantry Division was 'reformed' for a third time in 1944 as part of Operation Fortitude. A purely notional unit, in the deception it was depicted as intended to replace the real 4th Armored Division when the 4th Armored moved to Normandy.

The division was presented to the Germans as a well trained unit based in the area around Northwich, Cheshire with its headquarters located at Delamere House. When the 4th Armored Division moved to Normandy, the 11th Infantry Division was depicted as moving into the vacated quarters around Bury St Edmunds. There, as part of the (notional) US XXXIII Corps of the (notional) US 14th Army it was depicted as assigned the role of following up the Pas de Calais landings. In the aftermath of Fortitude South II the 11th Division was depicted as moving to Winchester in Hampshire during August, 1944.  The deception then had the 11th Division moving to Abergavenny in South Wales during October, 1944 when the deception was terminated by announcing that the 11th Division had been disbanded to provide replacements for other units. In the deception the 11th Infantry Division was composed of the notional 178th, 352nd, and 392d Infantry Regiments, in addition to notional artillery and support units.

References

Citations

Bibliography
 
 
 

011th
Operation Quicksilver (deception plan) formations
Military units and formations established in 1917
Military units and formations disestablished in 1919
United States Army divisions of World War I